Marshalldale is a historic mansion in Martin, Tennessee, USA.

History
The one-story house was completed in 1850. By 1875. a two-story addition, designed in the Italianate architectural style, was completed. The house was built for Marshall Presley Martin, a tobacco planter.

Architectural significance
It has been listed on the National Register of Historic Places since March 25, 1982.

References

Houses on the National Register of Historic Places in Tennessee
Italianate architecture in Tennessee
Queen Anne architecture in Tennessee
Houses completed in 1850
Houses in Weakley County, Tennessee
National Register of Historic Places in Weakley County, Tennessee